The Yihwa International Complex is a complex of skyscrapers located in Zhongshan District, Taipei, Taiwan. They are completed in 2014 and are the tallest buildings in Zhongshan District as of December 2020. 

Tower C houses the Taipei Marriott Hotel, which is managed by the Yihwa International Hotel Corporation. It has a total of 318 rooms and is one of the top luxury hotels in Taipei. The complex is located next to the Miramar Entertainment Park and features a unique view of the Taipei skyline from the rooms.

See also 
 List of tallest buildings in Asia
 List of tallest buildings in Taiwan
 List of tallest buildings in Taipei

References

2014 establishments in Taiwan
Residential skyscrapers in Taiwan
Skyscraper hotels in Taipei
Twin towers
Apartment buildings in Taiwan